Diogo Tomas (born 31 July 1997) is a Finnish professional footballer who plays for Norwegian club Odd, as a defender.

Club career
After playing for KuPS, Tomas signed for Norwegian club Odd in March 2023.

International career
Tomas was born in Oulu to a Finnish mother and Portuguese father. He plays for the Finland national team.

References

1997 births
Living people
Sportspeople from Oulu
Finnish footballers
Finland international footballers
Finnish people of Portuguese descent
FC Ilves players
Mikkelin Palloilijat players
FC Haka players
Veikkausliiga players
Ykkönen players
Kakkonen players
Association football defenders
Kuopion Palloseura players
Odds BK players
Finnish expatriate footballers
Finnish expatriates in Norway
Expatriate footballers in Norway